This is a list of the Austrian Singles Chart number-one hits of 1998.

See also
1998 in music

References

1998 in Austria
1998 record charts
Lists of number-one songs in Austria